Vladimír Chvátil  (born 1971), often known professionally as Vlaada Chvátil , is a Czech board game and video game designer. He became a recognizable name in the board game community following the publication of Through the Ages: A Story of Civilization in 2006 and thereafter his designs frequently made the top 100 list on BoardGameGeek. In 2016, he won the coveted "Spiel des Jahres" (Game of the Year) award for Codenames. In 2019, he entered the Origins Award Hall of Fame.

His most notable video game project was a real-time strategy Original War. He later worked on the role-playing video game Vision that has never been finished. In 2006, he left Altar and started to focus on board games. In 2010 he worked on Family Farm, a game that was developed by Hammerware.

Style
Vlaada's designs are strongly rooted in the game's theme preferring the mechanics that fit the theme best. His attachment to the theme is also evident in the way he writes the rules for his games which always make the theme apparent and sometimes even uses the theme to inject humor into the process of learning a game.

He also gained a reputation for innovative mechanics and a diverse range of designs, including the epic civilization game Through the Ages, the award-winning party word game Codenames, and the real time sci-fi adventure Galaxy Trucker which required the players to simultaneously rummage through a pile of cardboard tiles looking for ones to improve their spaceship.

Notable games

Video Games 
1992: Cervii
1997: Fish Fillets NG
2001: Original War
2007: Fish Fillets 2
2010: Family Farm
2014: Galaxy Trucker
 2017: Through the Ages

Board Games 
 1997: Arena: Morituri te salutant
 2002: Prophecy
 2005: Merry Men of Sherwood
 2006: Graenaland
 2006: Through the Ages: A Story of Civilization winner of 2007 International Gamers Awards – General Strategy; Multi-player
 2007: Kámen – Zbraně – Papír (Rock – Paper – Weapons)
 2007: Galaxy Trucker recommended at 2008 Spiel des Jahres
 2008: Space Alert winner of 2009 Spiel des Jahres "New Worlds Game"
 2008: Sacculus (a card game for Junák – Czech scouting organization)
 2009: Dungeon Lords
 2009: Bunny Bunny Moose Moose
 2010: Sneaks & Snitches
 2010: Travel Blog
 2011: Dungeon Petz
 2011: Mage Knight Board Game
 2011: Pictomania
 2013: Tash-Kalar: Arena of Legends
 2015: Codenames
 2016: Star Trek: Frontiers (not directly involved in the project but serving in an advisory role, based on the same system from Mage Knight Board Game)
 2017: That's a Question!
 2021: Galaxy Trucker new edition of existing game

References

External links
 

1971 births
Living people
Board game designers
Czech video game designers